Mirdeh-ye Olya (also Romanized as Mīrdeh-ye ‘Olyā) is a village in Dabuy-ye Shomali Rural District, Sorkhrud District, Mahmudabad County, Mazandaran Province, Iran. At the 2006 census, its population was 148, in 42 families.

References 

Populated places in Mahmudabad County